Stella and Sam is a Canadian children's television series based on the Canadian book series "Stella" and "Sam" by Marie-Louise Gay and published by Groundwood Books Inc. The series was developed for television by Radical Sheep Productions. This series no longer airs on Family Jr. in Canada as of September 1, 2016.
The French-language version of this show, Stella et Sacha, premiered on Disney Junior Télé on Sunday, October 3, 2010. The English-language version of the series premiered on the former Disney Junior channel on Sunday, January 9, 2011.

The show's theme music is performed by singer Emilie Mover.

The show premiered in the United States on April 2, 2018, the show started airing on the CBC Kids block.

The TV show is flash-animated, but it is made with Toon Boom Harmony.

Synopsis
In Manitoba, a nine-year-old girl named Stella guides her four-year-old brother, Sam, through the wild spaces beyond their back porch. For her, the great outdoors is more than just a place – it's a playmate. Sam learns that, with a little imagination, everyday items can be anything he wants it to be. For example, a chair can be a spaceship, a meadow where dragons roam, and a tall tree that transforms into a pirate ship. Their adventures gives Sam some questions. In turn, Stella has an endless supply of answers – as long as you're not too fussy about the facts.

Cast
Rachel Marcus as Stella Bocquelet, a nine-year-old girl, who is Sam's imaginative and fun-loving older sister.
Miles Johnson as Sam Bocquelet, a four-year-old boy, who is Stella's little brother.
Tony Daniels as Fred, Stella's and Sam's pet dog and a constant companion.
Robbie Fitzroy as Owen, Sam's best friend. 
Christina Orjalo as Ivy, Stella's female best friend, who always carries a purse.
Jake Sim as Felix, Stella's male best friend and school classmate, who wears a green-and-white-striped shirt under a blue jacket.
Pattycake, Felix's pet cat.

Episodes

Where it airs on
Canada: Various channels
Australia and New Zealand: Disney Junior
Mexico: Canal Once
Argentina: Pakapaka
France: Piwi+
Spain: ???
Portugal: RTP2
Germany: KiKA
Netherlands: NPO Zappelin
Turkey: Düşyeri TV and minika ÇOCUK
Sweden: SVT Barnkanalen
Norway: NRK Super
Finland: Yle TV2
Arab World: MBC 3
Iran: IRIB Pooya

References

External links
Radical Sheep Productions Inc.
Stella and Sam on Facebook

2010s Canadian animated television series
Canadian children's animated adventure television series
Family Channel (Canadian TV network) original programming
Family Jr. original programming
CBC Television original programming
Canadian television shows based on children's books
Animated television series about siblings
Animated television series about children
2011 Canadian television series debuts
2013 Canadian television series endings
Qubo
Canadian preschool education television series
Animated preschool education television series
2010s preschool education television series
Television series by Radical Sheep Productions
Television shows set in Manitoba
English-language television shows